"My Heart Is an Open Book" is a song written by Hal David and Lee Pockriss and performed by Carl Dobkins Jr. It reached #3 on the U.S. pop chart and #11 on the U.S. R&B chart in 1959.  It was featured on his 1959 album Carl Dobkins, Jr.

The single ranked #19 on Billboard's Year-End Hot 100 singles of 1959.

Other versions
Jimmy Dean released a version of the song as a single in 1958, but it did not chart.
Michael Holliday released a version of the song as a single in 1958, but it did not chart.
Dean Martin released a version of the song on his 1965 album, Dean Martin Hits Again.
Cliff Richard released a version of the song on his 1965 EP, Take Four by Cliff Richard.
Jan Crutchfield released a version of the song as a single in 1968, but it did not chart.
The Fantastic Baggys released a version of the song on their compilation album, Anywhere the Girls Are!: The Best of Fantastic Baggys.
Luther Henderson and His Orchestra released a version of the song on their 2002 compilation album, Clap Hands!/The Greatest Sound Around.

References

1958 songs
1958 singles
1968 singles
Songs with lyrics by Hal David
Songs written by Lee Pockriss
Carl Dobkins Jr. songs
Jimmy Dean songs
Dean Martin songs
Cliff Richard songs
Decca Records singles
Columbia Records singles